Rail Workers (Swedish: Rallare) is a 1947 Swedish drama film directed by Arne Mattsson and starring Victor Sjöström, John Elfström and Gunnel Broström. It was shot at the Råsunda Studios in Stockholm. The film's sets were designed by the art director Nils Svenwall. It is based on the 1946 novel Nordanvind by  Olle Länsberg.

Synopsis
In 1902 a team of navvies work on the construction of a new railway line from Luleå on the Gulf of Bothnia in Northern Sweden to Narvik on the Norwegian Sea, then under Swedish sovereignty. Valfrid, from Southern Sweden, is ostracised by the other workers and their informal leader Stora Ballong.

Cast
 Victor Sjöström as Stora Ballong
 John Elfström as Valfrid Andersson
 Gunnel Broström as 	Viktoria
 Åke Grönberg as 	Calle-Ville
 Inga Landgré as 	Hildur
 Sven Magnusson as 	Dynamiten
 Ingrid Borthen as 	Svarta Björn
 Bengt Eklund as 	Amos Forslund
 Svea Holst as 	Stina
 Axel Högel as 	Baptist-Anders
 Birger Åsander as 	Filip Bred
 Henake Schubak as Sikkavaara Frans
 Gösta Holmström as 	Bråk-Olle	
 Sven Bergvall as 	Blom
 Kolbjörn Knudsen as 	Holmberg
 Einar Söderbäck as 	Söder
 Carl Deurell as 	King Oscar II
 Arthur Fischer as 	Langar-Oskar 
 Martin Ljung as The King's adjutant 
 Artur Rolén as Artilleri-Emil 
 Keve Hjelm as 	Natan 
 Ivar Wahlgren as 	Railroad watchman
 Tor Borong as 	Railroad worker

References

Bibliography 
 McIlroy, Brian. World Cinema: Sweden. Flicks Books, 1986.
 Qvist, Per Olov & von Bagh, Peter. Guide to the Cinema of Sweden and Finland. Greenwood Publishing Group, 2000.

External links 
 

1947 films
1947 drama films
1940s Swedish-language films
Films directed by Arne Mattsson
Films set in the 1900s
Swedish historical drama films
1940s historical drama films
Films based on Swedish novels
1940s Swedish films